The Union of Domestic Workers of Germany was a trade union representing domestic staff in Germany.

The union was founded in 1909 and was based in Berlin.  It published the newspaper Zentralorgan der Verband der Hausangestellten Deutschlands and affiliated to the General Commission of German Trade Unions.  In 1919, the union was a founding affiliate of the General German Trade Union Federation.  By 1920, it had 20,014 members, but this then fell, and hyperinflation put the union in financial difficulties.  In 1923, it merged into the German Transport Workers' Union.

Presidents
1909: Ida Baar
1913: Wilhelmine Kähler (acting)
1913: Luise Kähler

References

Domestic workers' unions
Trade unions established in 1909
Trade unions disestablished in 1923
Trade unions in Germany